Tropidophora fimbriata is a species of land snail with a gill and an operculum, a terrestrial gastropod mollusk in the family Pomatiidae.

This species is found in the Mascarenes. Subspecies include T. f. rodriguesensis and T. f. haemostoma.

Original description 
Tropidophora fimbriata was originally described as Cyclostoma fimbriata by Jean-Baptiste Lamarck in 1822.

Lamarck's original text (the type description) in Latin language reads as follows:

References
This article incorporates public domain text from reference.

Further reading 
  Pfeiffer L. K. G. 1846. Die gedeckelten Lungenschnecken : (Helicinaceae et Cyclostomaceae): in Abbildungen nach der Natur mit Beschreibungen. II. volume. Bauer und Raspe, Nürnberg. page 179.

External links
  Image and description

Tropidophora
Gastropods described in 1822